Nyaung Waing Village is a village in Kawa Township, Bago Region, Myanmar.

References

Populated places in Bago Region